Maneye Manthralaya (Kannada: ಮನೆಯೇ ಮಂತ್ರಾಲಯ) is a 1986 Indian Kannada film, directed by H. R. Bhargava and produced by Anuradha Singh, Dushyanth Singh and Amritha Singh. The film stars Anant Nag, Bharathi, Jai Jagadish and Mukhyamantri Chandru in the lead roles. The film has musical score by M. Ranga Rao.

Cast

Anant Nag
Bharathi
Jai Jagadish
Tara
Ramesh Aravind
Nagesh Yadav
Mukhyamantri Chandru
Dingri Nagaraj
Umashree
Uma Shivakumar
Mysore Lokesh
Shanthamma
Kavya Krishnamurthy
Sangram Singh
Jairaj Singh
Pranaya Murthy
Master Sanjay
Master Chethan
Baby Pramodhini
Radha
Sapna

Soundtrack
The music was composed by M. Ranga Rao.

References

External links
 
 

1986 films
1980s Kannada-language films
Films scored by M. Ranga Rao
Films directed by H. R. Bhargava